Migsey Dussu (born 25 January 1972) is a Cuban fencer. She competed in the women's individual foil event at the 2000 Summer Olympics.

References

External links
 

1972 births
Living people
Cuban female foil fencers
Olympic fencers of Cuba
Fencers at the 2000 Summer Olympics
Pan American Games medalists in fencing
Pan American Games gold medalists for Cuba
Pan American Games silver medalists for Cuba
Fencers at the 1995 Pan American Games
Medalists at the 1995 Pan American Games
21st-century Cuban women
20th-century Cuban women
20th-century Cuban people